The Association of Marist Schools of Australia (MSA) is an organisation that seeks to unite the various  schools across Australia which have at any stage in their history been connected to the Australian provinces of the Marist Brothers, Marist Sisters or Marist Fathers, and by that union assist them in the provision of quality Marist education according to the traditions and charism passed down by the founders of the orders, Saint Marcellin Champagnat, Sister Jeanne-Marie Chavoin and Jean-Claude Colin.

The Association organises sporting competitions which attract competitors from many of the nation's Marist schools, in basketball, cricket, netball and oratory. It also coordinates a biennial conference of Marist educators, to strengthen their sense of Marist identity and spirituality, and affirm their mission of evangelization.

Sexual abuse allegations
In June, July and August 2014 the Royal Commission into Institutional Responses to Child Sexual Abuse, a royal commission of inquiry initiated in 2013 by the Australian Government and supported by all of its state governments, began an investigation into the response of Marist Brothers to allegations of child sexual abuse in schools in the ACT, NSW and Queensland.

References

External links

 
Australian schools associations